Eikefjord is a village in Kinn Municipality in Vestland county, Norway. The village is located at the end of the Eikefjorden along the Norwegian National Road 5 highway.

Eikefjord Church is located in this village, serving the southeastern part of the municipality.  This village was the administrative centre of the old municipality of Eikefjord which existed from 1923 until 1964.

Name
The village was named after the old Eikefjord farm since the Eikefjord Church was located there.  The farm is named after the Eikefjorden which is located nearby.  The fjord name comes from the Old Norse word eiki which means oak wood.

Population
In 2001, the village of Eikefjord had 322 inhabitants. The greater Eikefjord area had exactly 1,000 inhabitants, with 322 inhabitants in the village of Eikefjord, 100 in Tonheim/Grov, 88 in Sunnarvik, 192 in Hovland, 55 in Svardal/Steindalen, 117 in Langedal/Ramsdal, and 126 in Endestad/Løkkebø.  Also in 2001, the whole Eikefjord district has a population of 1,273.

References

Villages in Vestland
Kinn